Tha Chang, or well known in Thai Tha Chang Wang Luang, with designated pier code N9, is a pier on Chao Phraya River located on the end of  Na Phra Lan Road in the area behind Grand Palace next to Nagaraphirom Park and Ratchaworadit Pier.

Description
Its name meaning "Elephant Pier" (Tha is jetty, pier and Chang is elephant), it was built in the reign of King Phutthayotfa Chulalok (Rama I), who was the first monarch of Chakri Dynasty and the founder of Rattanakosin Kingdom. At that time, elephants from the Grand Palace were brought to this area to take a bath, therefore making it called "Tha Chang" in Thai. 

It was also known by another name in those days as "Tha Phra" ("Pier for Buddha") because it was the point where a large Buddha image named Phra Sri Sakyamuni was brought from a raft to be enshrined in the inner city (well known nowadays as Rattanakosin Island). Phra Sri Sakyamuni is now the principal Buddha image of Wat Suthat.

At present, Tha Chang is a pier that provides Chao Phraya Express Boat that runs between Bangkok and the north ends in Nonthaburi Province, including a ferry pier that crosses to Thonburi side at the Wat Rakhang in Bangkok Noi District and Tha Wang Lang in the area of Siriraj Hospital as well. In addition, it also has a number of retail shops and eateries. At the corner of the Tha Chang area, there are old shophouses built during King Chulalongkorn (Rama V)’s reign with beautiful plaster pediment, pilasters and stucco. They are all buildings that have been registered as archaeological sites by the Fine Arts Department since 2001 and have been renovated and maintained at present.

Another Tha Chang
There is another Tha Chang, Tha Chang Wang Na. It was formerly a royal pier and then a ferry port, taking passenger to Bangkok Noi railway station and other places along the canal Khlong Bangkok Noi. The area was once located back gate of the Wang Na (Front Palace). There was a royal elephant kraal nearby. The pier where royal elephants were brought for bathing known as "Tha Chang Wang Na" (The Front Palace's Elephant Pier). In the King Rama IV's reign, Prince Pinklao (second king resided at front palace) preferred his courtiers to park their barges at the pier near to his residence. He ordered to demolish part of the city wall and replaced by a gate for the royal elephant passing by. The pier was called Tha Chang since then. The former elephant pier was later changed its name to "Tha Khun Nang Wang Na" (ท่าขุนนางวังหน้า, "The Front Palace's Courtier Pier"). 

For the present, Tha Chang Wang Na has long lost its status as a pier. It is located under the Phra Pin Klao Bridge on the beginning of Phra Athit Road next to Bangkok Tourism Division.
 Moreover, its vicinity is the location of Phra Arthit Mansion, or unofficially known as "Tham Niab Tha Chang" (ทำเนียบท่าช้าง, "Tha Chang House"), it was the residence of senior statesman Pridi Banomyong during his regent tenure in World War II period.

References

External links
 

Phra Nakhon district
Neighbourhoods of Bangkok
Chao Phraya Express Boat piers
Piers in Thailand